Festival (stylized as Festival!) is a 1967 American documentary film about the Newport Folk Festival, written, produced, and directed by Murray Lerner.

Plot
Though the movie was subtitled "Folk Music at Newport 1963–1966," it was filmed over the course of three festivals at Newport (1963-1965) and also features Bob Dylan's controversial 1965 electric set at Newport.

Reception
Roger Ebert gave the film  out of four stars. His highest praise was for the editors, explaining, "They make their points quietly, with humor and understatement. The result is marvelously entertaining." He also gave credit to Lerner for making "full use of the strength of documentary film, the ability to catch unrehearsed moments that reveal personality."

Accolades
Festival was nominated for an Academy Award for Best Documentary Feature in 1968.

Musicians
The film features appearances by the following artists:

Joan Baez
Horton Barker
Fiddler Beers
Theodore Bikel
Mike Bloomfield
Blue Ridge Mountain Dancers
Paul Butterfield Blues Band
Johnny Cash
Judy Collins
Cousin Emmy
Donovan
Bob Dylan
Mimi and Richard Fariña
Freedom Singers
Georgia Sea Island Singers
Ronnie Gilbert
Mrs. Ollie Gilbert
Fannie Lou Hamer
Son House
Howlin' Wolf
Mississippi John Hurt
Spider John Koerner
Jim Kweskin Jug Band
Tex Logan and The Lilly Brothers
Mel Lyman
Spokes Mashiyane
Mississippi Fred McDowell
Clayton McMichen
Moving Star Hall Singers
Odetta
Osborne Brothers
Joe Patterson
Peter, Paul & Mary
Almeda Riddle
Eck Robertson
Sacred Harp Singers
Buffy Sainte-Marie
Mike Seeger
Pete Seeger
Hobart Smith
The Staple Singers
Swan Silvertones
Mrs. General Watson
Sonny Terry & Brownie McGhee
Reverend Wilkins
Young Fife and Drum Corps

See also
List of American films of 1967
Monterey Pop, the 1968 filming of the Monterey Pop Festival
Dont Look Back, the 1967 documentary film also featuring Bob Dylan

References

External links

Festival: Who Knows What’s Gonna Happen Tomorrow? an essay by Amanda Petrusich at the Criterion Collection
Festival on MUBI

1967 films
1967 documentary films
American black-and-white films
American documentary films
Documentary films about music festivals
Films directed by Murray Lerner
Films about Bob Dylan
1960s English-language films
1960s American films
English-language documentary films